Hans-Peter von Kirchbach (born 3 August 1941) is a retired German general and former Chief of Staff of the Federal Armed Forces from 1999 to 2000.

Von Kirchbach was one of three chairpersons of the Protestant Scouting association Verband Christlicher Pfadfinderinnen und Pfadfinder from 1988 to 1991. From 2002 to 2013 he was president of Johanniter-Unfall-Hilfe (JUH), a Protestant humanitarian organisation; in 2013 he was elected as honorary president of JUH.

External links
Biography on BMVg website

1941 births
Bundeswehr generals
Inspectors General of the Bundeswehr
Generals of the German Army
Living people
Scouting and Guiding in Germany
Commanders Crosses of the Order of Merit of the Federal Republic of Germany
Recipients of the Order of Merit of the Free State of Saxony
Military personnel from Weimar